Orthaulax is an extinct genus of sea snails in the family Strombidae.

Species
O. aguadillensis (Maury, 1920)
O. altilis (Pilsbry, 1922)
O. bermudezi (Clench and Aguayo, 1939)
O. brasiliensis (Maury, 1925)
O. caepa (Cooke, 1921)
O. conoides (Woodring, 1923)
O. dainellii (Savazzi, 1989)
O. gabbi (Dall, 1890)
O. hernandoensis (Mansfield, 1937)
O. inornatus (Gabb, 1872)
O. japonicus (Nagao, 1924)
O. portoricoensis (Hubbard, 1921)
O. pugnax (Heilprin, 1887)
O. seaforthensis (Trechmann, 1941)

References

Strombidae